Uncial 0271 (in the Gregory-Aland numbering), is a Greek uncial manuscript of the New Testament. Paleographically it has been assigned to the 9th century.

Description 

The codex contains a small part of the Gospel of Matthew 12:27-39, on one parchment leaf (33 cm by 26 cm). Written in two columns per page, 26 lines per page, in uncial letters. It is a palimpsest, the upper text contains menaeon in Greek. Formerly it was included together with Uncial 0272 and Uncial 0273 in Uncial 0133. 

Currently it is dated by the INTF to the 9th century.

Location 
The codex is currently housed at the British Library (Add MS 31919, f. 22) in London.

Text 
The Greek text of this codex is a representative of the Alexandrian text-type. Aland placed it in Category II.

See also 

 List of New Testament uncials
 Textual criticism

References 

Greek New Testament uncials
Palimpsests
9th-century biblical manuscripts
British Library additional manuscripts